The Alamosa River is a river in the southern part of the U.S. state of Colorado.

The river's name means "shaded with cottonwoods" in Spanish.

The river was affected by the Summitville mine disaster, the worst cyanide spill in United States history.

See also

 List of rivers in Colorado
 List of tributaries of the Rio Grande

References

External links

 epa.gov site
 fws.gov site

Tributaries of the Rio Grande
Rivers of Colorado
Rivers of Conejos County, Colorado
Rivers of Rio Grande County, Colorado
Rivers of Alamosa County, Colorado